Salam Rinaroy Devi (born 5 February 1993) is an Indian footballer who plays as a forward for The Young Welfare Club. She has been a member of the India women's national team.

Honours

India
 SAFF Women's Championship: 2012, 2016

Manipur
 Senior Women's National Football Championship: 2019–20, 2021–22
 National Games Gold medal: 2022

References

1993 births
Footballers from Manipur
Living people
India women's international footballers
Indian women's footballers
Sportswomen from Manipur
Women's association football forwards
Eastern Sporting Union players